The following is a list of notable English and British painters (in chronological order).

English painters

Born 16th century

George Gower (c. 1540–1596)
Nicolas Hilliard (1547–1619)
Sir Nathaniel Bacon (1585–1627)
Cornelis Janssens van Ceulen (1593–1661)
Sir Anthony van Dyck (1599–1641) born in Antwerp; Principal Painter in Ordinary to the King
William Larkin (1580–1619)

Born 17th century

Emmanuel de Critz (1608–1665)
William Dobson (1610–1646)
John Michael Wright (1617–1694)
Peter Lely (1618–1680) Principal Painter in Ordinary to Charles II (1661)
Oliver de Critz (1626–1651)
Henry Gibbs (1630/1–1713)
Edward Bower (fl. 1635–1667)
Henry Cooke (1642–1700)
Sir Godfrey Kneller (1646–1723)
John Riley, or Ryley (1646–1691)
Marmaduke Cradock (1660–1716)
Sir James Thornhill (1675–1734)
Edward Byng (c. 1676–1753)
Peter Monamy (1681–1749)
John Wootton (1682–1764)
Isaac Whood (1689–1752)
Joseph Highmore (1692–1780)
John Vanderbank (1694–1739)
William Hogarth (1697–1764)

British painters

Born 18th century

Thomas Hudson (1701–1779)
Mary Hoare (1744–1820)
William Hoare (c. 1707–1792)
Francis Hayman (1708–1776)
Sir William Beechey (1753–1839)
John Shackleton (1714–1767) Principal Painter in Ordinary to George II and George III
Richard Wilson (1714–1782)
William Keable (1714–1774)
Charles Brooking (1723–1759)
Sir Joshua Reynolds (1723–1792) Principal Painter in Ordinary to the King
George Stubbs (1724–1806)
Thomas Gainsborough (1727–1788)
Sawrey Gilpin (1733–1807)
Johann Zoffany (1733–1810) born in Frankfurt
Peter Perez Burdett (c. 1734–1793)
George Romney (1734–1802)
Joseph Wright of Derby (1734–1797)
Jeremiah Meyer (1735–1789)  born in Tübingen
Richard Wright (1735–c.1775)
Amos Green (1735–1807)
Mary Benwell (1739–after 1800)
John Hamilton Mortimer (1740–1779)
Henry Fuseli (1741–1825) born in Zurich, Switzerland
Matthew William Peters (1742–1814)
Mary Moser (1744–1819)
William Hodges (1744–1797)
Henry Walton (1746–1813)
William Tate (1747–1806)
Richard Morton Paye (1751–1820)
Joseph Barney (1753–1832)
Charles Lewis (1753–1795) still life painter
Maria Bell (1755–1825)
Prince Hoare the Younger (1755–1834) painter and dramatist
Philip (or Philippe) Jean (1755–1802) of Jersey
Thomas Stothard (1755–1834)
Henry Bone (1755–1834)
William Blake (1757–1827)
George William Sartorius (1759–1828)
Lemuel Francis Abbott (1760–1803)
Sir Thomas Lawrence (1760–1830) Principal Painter in Ordinary to the King
George Augustus Wallis (1761–1847)
George Morland (1763–1804)
Samuel Drummond (1766–1844)
John Crome (1768–1821)
Thomas Barker (1769–1847)
James Ward (1769–1859)
William Armfield Hobday (1771–1831)
Edward Bird (1772–1819)
Charles Henry Schwanfelder (1774–1837)
Thomas Girtin (1775–1802)
Joseph Mallord William Turner (1775–1851)
John Constable (1776–1837)
John Jackson (1778–1831)
John Varley (1778–1842)
William John Huggins (1781–1845), marine painter 
Richard Barrett Davis (1782–1854)
John Sell Cotman (1782–1842)
David Cox (1783–1859)
Sir David Wilkie (1785–1841) Principal Painter in Ordinary to the King
Caroline Maria Applebee (c. 1785–1854)
Benjamin Haydon (1786–1846)
William Mulready (1786–1863)
William Etty  (1787–1849)
John Martin (1789–1854)
William Linton (1791–1876)
Sir George Hayter (1792–1871) Principal Painter in Ordinary to the Queen
Margaret Sarah Carpenter (1793–1872)
Francis Danby (1793–1861)
Charles Robert Leslie (1794–1859)
Sir William Charles Ross (1794–1860)
Henry Collen (1797–1879)
Paul Delaroche (1797–1856)
Joseph Stannard (1797–1830)
Frederick Richard Lee (1798–1879)
Thomas Witlam Atkinson (1799–1861)
Samuel Atkins, marine painter

Born 19th century

Born 1800–1824

John Hayter (1800–1895)
Thomas Webster (1800–1886)
James Digman Wingfield (1800-1872)
Sir Edwin Henry Landseer (1802–1873)
Thomas Sidney Cooper (1803–1902)
John Scarlett Davis (1804–1845)
Edwin Wilkins Field (1804–1871)
William Knight Keeling (1807–1886)
George Armfield (Smith) (1808–1893)
Thomas Baker (1809–1864)
William Edward Frost (1810–1877)
James Peel (1811-1906)
Henry Dawson (1811–1878)
Ebenezer Colls (1812–1887)
Richard Barnett Spencer (1812–1897)
Thomas Musgrave Joy (1812–1866)
Edmund John Niemann (1813–1876)
Harry Hall (c. 1814–1882)
John Absolon (1815–1895)
James Francis Danby (1816–1875)
Augustus Egg (1816–1863)
Edward Matthew Ward (1816–1879)
Henry Mark Anthony (1817–1886)
Branwell Brontë (1817–1848)
Richard Dadd (1817–1886)
Thomas Danby (1817–1886)
John Callcott Horsley (1817–1903)
John Phillip (1817–1867)
George Frederic Watts (1817–1904)
Margaret Backhouse (1818–1888)
Louisa Beresford (1818–1891)
John Anster Fitzgerald (c. 1819–1906)
William Powell Frith (1819–1909)
James Sant (1820–1916)
Ford Madox Brown (1821–1893)
Charles Elder (1821–1851)
Sir Joseph Noel Paton (1821–1901)
James Smetham (1821–1889)
Thomas Holroyd (1821–1904)
Lefevre James Cranstone (1822–1893)
Frederick Goodall (1822–1904)
George Hardy (1822–1909)
William Simpson (1823–1899)
William Shakespeare Burton (1824–1916)
Martha Darley Mutrie (1824–1885)
Frances Emilia Crofton (1822–1910)

Born 1825–1849

Eleanor Vere Boyle (1825–1916)
Annie Feray Mutrie (1826–1893)
David Cooke Gibson (1827–1856)
Frederick Daniel Hardy (1827–1911)
William Holman Hunt (1827–1910)
John Wharlton Bunney (1828–1882)
George Bernard O'Neill (1828–1917)
Dante Gabriel Rossetti (1828–1882)
Anna Blunden (1829–1915)
John Bagnold Burgess (1829–1897)
John Finnie (1829–1907)
Edwin Long (1829–1890)
John Everett Millais (1829–1896)
John Samuel Raven (1829–1877)
Lord Frederick Leighton (1830–1896)
Helen Mabel Trevor (1831–1900)
Arthur Hughes (1832–1915)
Louise Rayner (1832–1924)
Henrietta Ward (1832–1924)
George Henry Boughton (1833–1905)
Edward Burne-Jones (1833–1898)
Benjamin Williams Leader (1833–1921)
Frederic Shields (1833–1911)
William Morris (1834–1896)
Emily Mary Osborn (1834–1913)
Sir Lawrence Alma-Tadema (1836–1912) born in Dronrijp, Netherlands
John Atkinson Grimshaw (1836–1893)
Walter Field (1837–1901)
Charles Stuart (1838–1907)
Walter Goodman (1838–1912)
Charles Edward Perugini (1839–1918)
Kate Perugini (1839–1929)
John Clayton Adams (1840–1906)
Philip Augustus Barnard (1840–1884)
Albert Joseph Moore (1841–1893)
Edith Martineau (1842–1909)
Edwin Ellis (1842–1895)
Sydney Prior Hall (1842–1922)
Thomas Bush Hardy (1842–1897) – marine painter
Clara Montalba (1842–1929)
Herbert William Weekes (c. 1842–unknown)
Louise Jopling (1843–1933)
Bernard Walter Evans (1843–1922)
Isabel Dacre (1844–1933)
Tristram Ellis (1844–1922)
Augustus Edwin Mulready (1844–1904)
Frances C. Fairman (1839–1923)
Marie Spartali Stillman (1844–1927)
Annie Swynnerton (1844–1933)
Edith Gittins (1845–1910)
Louisa Starr (1845–1909) 

Edith Corbet (1846–1920)
Walter Greaves (1846–1930)
Kate Greenaway (1846–1901)
William Biscombe Gardner (1847–1919)
Ellis Rowan (1847–1922)
Helen Allingham (1848–1926)
Helen Thornycroft (1848–1937)
John William Waterhouse (1849–1917)
John Reinhard Weguelin (1849–1927)
William Thornley (fl. 1858–1898)

Born 1850–1874

Walter Daniel Batley (1850–1936)
John Collier (1850–1934)

Edward Robert Hughes (1851–1914)
Laura Alma-Tadema (1852–1909)

George Clausen (1852–1944)
Alfred Richard Gurrey, Sr. (1852–1944)
Charles Napier Kennedy (1852–1898)
Walter Langley (1852–1922)
Frank Bernard Dicksee (1853–1928)
Edmund Blair Leighton (1853–1922)
Alfred Robert Quinton (1853–1934)
Mary Henrietta Dering Curtois (1854–1929)
Caroline Gotch (1854–1945)  
Frank Markham Skipworth (1854–1929) 
George Paice (1854–1925)
Edward Wilkins Waite (1854–1924)
Sara Page (1855–1943)
Marianne Stokes (1855–1927)

Alfred Wallis (1855–1942)
Evelyn De Morgan (1855–1919)
Robert C. Barnfield (1856–1893)
Jane Mary Dealy, Lady Lewis (1856–1939)
Alice Hirschberg (1856–1913)
Joseph Vickers de Ville (1856–1925)

William Wells Quatremain (1857–1930)
William Stott-of-Oldham (1857–1900)
Arthur Melville (1858–1904)
Henry Scott Tuke (1858–1929)
George Henry (painter) (1858–1943)
Elizabeth Armstrong Forbes (1859–1912)

Henrietta Rae (1859–1928)
Charles W. Bartlett (1860–1940)
Lewis Charles Powles (1860–1942)
Christabel Cockerell (1863–1951)
Margaret Bernadine Hall (1863–1910)
George Phoenix (1863–1935)
Arthur Wardle (1864–1949)
Arthur Lowe (1865–1940)
John Guille Millais (1865–1931)
Louise Pickard (1865–1928)
Charles Spencelayh (1865–1958)
Milly Childers (1866–1922)
Mary Davis, Lady Davis (1866–1941)
Helen Thomas Dranga (1866–1940)
Roger Fry (1866–1934)
Helen Beatrix Potter (1866–1943)
Anna Alma-Tadema (1867–1943) born in Brussels
Frank Brangwyn (1867–1956) born in Bruges
Percy Robertson (1868–1934)
Ursula Wood (1868–1925)
Mary Baylis Barnard (1870–1946)
Mary McEvoy (1870–1941)
Aubrey Vincent Beardsley (1872–1898)
Eleanor Fortescue-Brickdale (1872–1945)
William Heath Robinson (1872–1944)
Henry Keyworth Raine (1872–1932)
Alexander Scott (1872–1932)
William Nicholson (1872–1949)
Louie Burrell (1873–1971)
Amy Drucker (1873–1951)
Edmund Hodgson Smart (1873–1942)
Isabel Codrington (1874–1943)

Born 1875–1899

Arthur Henry Knighton-Hammond (1875–1970)
Madge Oliver (1875–1924)
Sophie Atkinson (1876–1972)
Winifred Austen (1876–1964)
Isobelle Ann Dods-Withers (1876–1939)
Gwen John (1876–1939)

Frank Cadogan Cowper (1877–1958)
Laura Knight (1877–1970)
Frank Montague Moore (1877–1967)
Walter Ernest Webster (1877–1959) 
Hilda Annetta Walker (1877–1960)
Eliza Mary Burgess (1878–1961)
May Louise Greville Cooksey (1878–1943)
Augustus John (1878–1961)
Vanessa Bell (1879–1961)
Gertrude Harvey (1879–1966)
John Hodgson Lobley (1879–1954)
Anna Airy (1882–1964)
Gladys Kathleen Bell (1882–1965)
Teresa Copnall (1882–1972)
Helen Edwards (1882–1963)
Richard Howard Penton (1882–1960) 
Eleanor Hughes (1882–1952)
Averil Burleigh (1883–1949)
John Currie (artist) (1884–1914)
Wyndham Lewis (1884–1957)
Louisa Puller (1884–1963)
Hilary Dulcie Cobbett (1885–1976)
Duncan Grant (1885–1978)
Esther Blaikie MacKinnon (1885–1934)
Evelyn Abelson (1886–1967)
Mary Jewels (1886–1977)
James Ardern Grant (1887–1973)
Laurence Stephen Lowry (1887–1976)
Archibald Eliot Haswell Miller (1887–1979)
Elizabeth Polunin (1887–1950)
Stanley Royle (1888–1961)
Paul Cranfield Smyth (1888–1963)
Margaret Lindsay Williams (1888–1960)
Nora Cundell (1889–1948)
Paul Nash (1889–1946)
Cedric Morris (1889–1982)
Marlow Moss (1889-1958)
Sir Henry Rushbury (1889–1968)
Ruth Simpson (1889–1964)
David Bomberg (1890-1957)
Olive Mudie-Cooke (1890–1925)
Leon Underwood (1890–1975)
Grace English (1891–1956)
Stanley Spencer (1891–1959)
Dora Carrington (1893–1932)
Orovida Camille Pissarro (1893–1968)
Cowan Dobson (1894–1980)
Kaff Gerrard (1894–1970) 
Meredith Frampton (1894–1984)
Ben Nicholson (1894–1982)
Cicely Mary Barker (1895–1973)
Harry Bateman (1896–1976)
George Bissill (1896–1973)
Leila Faithfull (1896–1994)
Billie Waters (1896–1979)
Dorothy Coke (1897–1979)
Hans Feibusch (1898–1998) – born in Frankfurt, resided in England 1934–1998
Winifred Knights (1899–1947)
Rose Henriques (1889–1972)
Francis Helps (1890–1972)

Unknown year, born 19th century

Edward Pritchett (fl. 1828–1864)

Florence Claxton (fl. 1840–1879)
Sara Macgregor (d. 1919)

Born 20th century

Born 1900–1949

George Lambourn (1900–1977)
Elsie Dalton Hewland (1901–1979)
John Mansbridge (1901–1981)
Marjorie May Bacon (1902–1988)
Marjorie Frances Bruford (1902–1958)
Frank Barrington Craig (1902–1951)
John Melville (1902–1986)
Thomas Symington Halliday (1902–1998)
John Piper (1903–1992)
Eric Ravilious (1903–1942)
Ceri Richards (1903–1971)
Graham Sutherland (1903–1980)
Mary Adshead (1904–1995)
Celia Frances Bedford (1904–1959)
Helen Binyon (1904–1979)
George Fisher Gilmour (1904–1984)
J. Edward Smith (1905–1986)
Griselda Allan (1905–1987)
Eliot Hodgkin (1905–1987)
Cecil Kennedy (1905–1997)
Emmy Bridgwater (1906–1999)
Patrick Hall (1906–1992)
Edgar Hubert (1906–1985)
Clifford Ellis (1907–1985)
Frank Egginton (1908–1990)
Isobel Heath (1908–1989)
Thomas Carr (1909–1999)
Mildred Eldridge (1909–1991)
Geoffrey Tibble (1909–1952)
Francis Bacon (1909–1992)
Peter Rose Pulham (1910–1956)
Isabel Alexander (1910–1996)
John Kingsley Cook (1911–1994)
Anthony Devas (1911–1958)
Gwen Barnard (1912–1988)
Fay Pomerance  (1912–2001)
Raymond Teague Cowern (1913–1986)
Leonard Appelbee (1914–2000)
John Bridgeman (1914–2004)
Sylvia Molloy (1914–2008)
Doris Blair (born 1915)
Terry Frost (1915–2003)
William Gear (1915–1997)
Eileen Aldridge (1916–1990)
Leonora Carrington (1917–2011)
Michael Kidner (1917–2009)
Mary Audsley (1919–2008)
Eden Box (1919–1988)
Francis Davison (1919–1984)
Colin Hayes (1919–2003)
Heinz Koppel (1919–1980) born in Berlin; lived in Liverpool
Patrick Heron (1920–1999)
John Christoforou (1921–2014)
John Craxton (1922–2009)
Richard Hamilton (artist) (1922–2011)
Lucian Freud (1922–2011)
Pamela Ascherson (1923–2010)
Paul Bird (1923–1993)
Peter Folkes (1923–2019)
Martin Froy (1926–2017)
Ann Thetis Blacker (1927–2006)
Peter Brook (1927–2009)
John Plumb (1927–2008)
Patrick Swift (1927–1983) born in Ireland
John Copnall (1928–2007)
Elizabeth Jane Lloyd (1928–1995)
Adrian Morris (1929–2004)
Gillian Ayres (1930–2018)
Mardi Barrie (1930–2004)
Robyn Denny (1930–2014)
Eva Frankfurther (1930–1959) born in Germany
Martin Bradley (born 1931)
Ken Messer (1931–2018)
Bridget Riley (born 1931)
Peter Blake (born 1932)
Howard Hodgkin (1932–2017)
Moira Huntly (born 1932)
Norman Douglas Hutchinson (1932–2010)
Marc Vaux (born 1932)
Alexander Goudie (1933–2004)
John Hoyland (1934–2011)
Jeremy Moon (1934–1973)
Ivor Davies (born 1935)
Ken Kiff (1935–2001)
Patrick Caulfield (1936–2005)
Timothy Behrens (1937–2017)
David Hockney (born 1937)
Tess Jaray (born 1937)
Bryan Organ (born 1935)
Margot Perryman (born 1938)
William Tillyer (born 1938)
Mario Dubsky (1939–1985)
John Wonnacott (born 1940)
Robert Lenkiewicz (1941–2002)
Sheila Mullen (born 1942)
Osi Rhys Osmond (1943–2015)
Lindsay Bartholomew (born 1944)
Claire Dalby (born 1944)
Bruce McLean (born 1944)
Jonathon Coudrille (born 1945)
P. J. Crook (born 1945)
Ali Omar Ermes (born 1945)
David Imms (born 1945)
Sean Scully (born 1945) – born in Dublin, Ireland; studied in London and Newcastle; lives and works abroad.
Timothy Hyman (born 1946)
Edward Kelly (born 1946)
John Virtue (born 1947)
Howard J. Morgan (1949–2020)
Terance James Bond (born 1946)

Born 1950–1999

Cherryl Fountain (born 1950)
Roy Petley (born 1951)
Chinwe Chukwuogo-Roy MBE (1952-2012)
Brian Clarke (born 1953)
Jeremy Henderson (born 1952)
Deirdre Hyde (born 1953)
Charlotte Verity (born 1954)
Vivien Blackett (born 1955)
Peter Edwards (born 1955)
Nicholas Hely Hutchinson (born 1955)
Jo Self (born 1956)
Panayiotis Kalorkoti (born 1957)
John O'Carroll (born 1958)
Peter Doig (born 1959)
Claudette Johnson (born 1959)
David Leapman (born 1959)
Ian Davenport (born 1960)
Nick Fudge (born 1960)
Keith Piper (born 1960)
Sonia Boyce (born 1962)
Gary Hume (born 1962)
Tod Hanson (born 1963)
Guy Denning (born 1965)
Damien Hirst (born 1965)
George Shaw (born 1966)
Chris Ofili (born 1968)
Chantal Joffe (born 1969)
Justin Mortimer (born 1970)
Banksy (born c. 1974)
Tom Palin (born 1974)
Stuart Pearson Wright (born 1975)
Idris Khan (born 1978)
Kate Groobey (born 1979)
David Wightman (born 1980)
Seb Toussaint (born 1988)

Unknown year, born 20th century
Freya Douglas-Morris
Charles Harris

See also

 British art
 English school of painting
 List of British artists

External links 
 ArtUK - British Artists - Database of British Painters whose work is in UK Public Collections.

References

 
Painters
British